Mander Portman Woodward is a group of British independent schools, with branches in London, Birmingham and Cambridge, offering GCSE and A-Level courses.

The college is an alternative to the traditional school setting. Students at MPW do not wear a uniform, are on first-name terms with their teachers and are taught to take responsibility for themselves and their learning, which is thought to establish the skills they will need for university. The colleges are cosmopolitan with around 70% British and 30% international students leading to a diverse mix of cultures and traditions.

Originally known as a crammer, MPW is also an option for full courses. The majority of students take two-year A-level courses and the colleges have expanded to provide for them in a more holistic way – extensive extra-curricular provision and facilities such as cafeterias and common rooms provide a positive overall student experience and expand from the founders' sole focus on academia.

The Chairman of the Governors is Steve Boyes. The CEO of the company is Spencer Coles, the former chief operating officer of Regent's University London.

History

The school was formed in its current structure in 1973 by Robert Woodward, Rodney Portman and Nicholas Mander with the aim of applying University of Cambridge-style tutorial teaching to school age students. MPW teaches in small groups (fewer than 10 students per class), which means that students get individual attention.  Mander Portman Woodward also offers Easter Revision courses for GCSE, AS and A level students from other schools. The London and Birmingham colleges are part of the CIFE group. MPW produce a range of books including 'Getting into...' guides, 'How to complete UCAS' and 'A-Z of surviving exams'.

It was announced on 17 July 2012 that the Apollo Group sold MPW to Levine Leichtman Capital Partners Incorporated for £54.8m. MPW contributed less than 1% of Apollo's earnings in 2011. MPW recorded operating profits of £3.93m (2010: £3.06m) in the twelve months ending August 2011 on revenues of £14.1m (2010: £12.6m). Operating margins hit 27.8% in 2011 up from 24.2% in the previous year.

It was announced in December 2015 that Levine Leichtman would sell MPW to Kaplan International. The terms of the transaction were not disclosed.

Results and destinations

At each MPW college in 2020 the most commonly achieved (modal) A level grade was A/A* and over 50% of examination entries were at this level. This trend has been consistent across the full MPW Group since 2015, in London since 2009 and in Cambridge since 2008.

The colleges are also very successful in terms of value-add, which measures the distance travelled by students at A level relative to where they were at GCSE,  and in their improvement of retake student grades, as reported by the Times and Sunday Times.

In 2020, 25% of UK placements were at top 10 universities (2021 Times Higher Education UK University Rankings).

Curriculum

The majority of students take A level courses. A small cohort each year take GCSE/IGCSE courses. One-year university foundation programmes are available for international students. The AQA Extended Project Qualification (EPQ) is available to students wishing to take this alongside their other studies, usually in year 12. Every new joiner has an admissions meeting preceding entry to formulate a tailored study plan; students have complete flexibility in terms of subject choice, level and course duration.

Full A level and GCSE courses are taught over two years, 18 months or an intensive one-year short course.  An increasing number of students also join MPW at the end of year 12 either to complete the courses that they have started at their previous schools or to begin a new set of subjects. There are 43 subjects available and no timetable restrictions.

Retakes: A level and GCSE retake courses are shorter and begin in either September or January. MPW has considerable expertise across exam boards and can provide retake courses on the following syllabuses: AQA, CIE, Edexcel/Pearson, OCR and WJEC. Students may take any subjects on a combination of different boards but will not be mixed in their classes: it is a fundamental principle at MPW that all students in a given group are studying for the same examination on the same board on the same date.

University preparation

MPW students can expect a considerable amount of assistance in applying to university. Personal tutors supervise and critique personal statements. Specialist preparation is available for students applying to Oxford University and Cambridge University and to competitive degree specialisms such as Medicine, Dentistry, Veterinary Medicine and Law. Tuition for entrance tests such as the UCAT, BMAT and LNAT is provided as well as interview practice.

MPW staff are experts in their field and author a series of 'Getting Into...' books to guide students through applications for subjects such as Medicine, Engineering and Business and Economics, and for entry to Oxbridge.

Examination Practice

Regular testing plays a major part in building MPW students confidence and motivation, as well as perfecting examination technique.

Revision tests are sat by all students at all levels, ensuring that revision is a continuous and cumulative process throughout the course. Additional timed assignments under supervised examination conditions are sat by students in their final examination year.

Pastoral System

MPW adopts a personal tutor system. Each student is assigned to a personal tutor (also called a Director of Studies) whose role is to supervise the academic progress, university applications and general welfare of a small group of students.

Regular one-to-one meetings are held to discuss test results, progress in class, homework, UCAS applications and reports. Parents are encouraged to communicate with Directors of Studies on a regular basis and informal meetings between parents, students and tutors provide a constructive forum for assessing progress.

Co-curricular

Extensive extra-curricular provision is available at all three colleges. Sport is very popular; other options include drama, charity fund-raising, student council, Duke of Edinburgh award, model United Nations, and debating.

Schools trips are regular. Each MPW college is situated in a prime location in close proximity to amenities such as museums and theatres. In addition, residential trips and trips overseas are organised to supplement learning.

Easter Revision

Easter Revision courses are taught in London, Birmingham and Cambridge for three weeks in March/April; MPW's status as a revision course provider was described by the Daily Telegraph as "quasi-legendary". Current students attend the courses, which are also available to external students; over 1600 join the colleges each year for Easter Revision. The courses are designed to prepare students for GCSE, AS and A level examinations the following summer.

London

The college is located in South Kensington on the historic road of Queen's Gate. It occupies three Georgian townhouses. The Good Schools Guide said that the school is "a positive, professional place with strong teaching and outstanding pastoral care". It is known as a 'society' sixth form college, educating the children of European and London high society, and is mentioned in society guides such as Tatler and the Sloane Ranger's Handbook.

Birmingham

The Birmingham college is located in Edgbaston, not far from the University of Birmingham, and was opened in 1980. The college is fully co-educational and prepares students for GCSE, A level and entrance for Oxbridge, medical school and dental school. There are fewer than 10 students in a class and a college roll of 240 students. The current principal is Mark Shingleton, who has been in post since 2009, and the vice principals are Adam Cross and James Bourne.

The college has a record in helping students attend dental and medical schools. Its students have won the CIFE Value Added Award numerous times for most improved student academic performance and won prizes for outstanding performances in the areas of mathematics, social science and humanities.

Ofsted inspection reports: "The college's most recent inspection has the college rated at Ofsted's maximum rating of 'Outstanding' across all assessment areas."

Cambridge

The Mander Portman Woodward college in Cambridge is situated on Brookside, just off Trumpington Road, a few minutes' walk from the centre of Cambridge. Established in 1987, it is a co-educational GCSE and A level college. Its most recent Ofsted inspection report has the college scoring Ofsted's maximum rating of Outstanding in all assessment areas.

Alumni 
 Lily Allen
 Edward Davenport
 Tamara Beckwith
 Petra Ecclestone
 Binky Felstead
 Spencer Matthews
 Jamie Laing
 Alice Dellal
 Lama Hasan
 Jiah Khan

References

External links 
 
 Profile at the Good Schools Guide
 Robert Woodward Obituary in The Times
 Independent Schools Inspectorate official website
 Ofsted inspection reports official website

1973 establishments in England
Educational institutions established in 1973
Private co-educational schools in London
Private schools in Birmingham, West Midlands
Private schools in the Royal Borough of Kensington and Chelsea
Private schools in Cambridgeshire
Schools in Cambridge